The Seiche is a  long river in western France located in the departments of Mayenne (Pays de la Loire) and Ille-et-Vilaine (Brittany). It is a left tributary of the river Vilaine. It flows into the Vilaine near Bruz, south of Rennes.

References

Rivers of France
Rivers of Manche
Rivers of Mayenne
Rivers of Orne
Rivers of Normandy
Rivers of Pays de la Loire